Inisheer (or  ) is the smallest and most easterly of the three Aran Islands in Galway Bay, Ireland.  With 281 residents as of the 2016 census, it is second-most populous of the Arans. Caomhán of Inis Oírr is the island's patron saint.  There are five small settlements: Baile Thiar, Chapeltown (Baile an tSéipéil), Castle Village (Baile an Chaisleáin), Baile an Fhormna and Baile an Lorgain.

Name
The island was originally called Árainn Airthir, and later Inis Oirthir, which are thought to mean "eastern Aran" and "eastern island" respectively. The second element is also found in the names Inishsirrer and Orior. According to Séamas Ó Murchú, the current official name, was brought into use by the Ordnance Survey Ireland.

Geology and geography 

The island is geologically an extension of The Burren.  The terrain of the island is composed of limestone pavements with crisscrossing cracks known as "grikes", leaving isolated rocks called "clints".

The limestones date from the Viséan period (Lower Carboniferous), formed as sediments in a tropical sea approximately 350 million years ago, and compressed into horizontal strata with fossil corals, crinoids, sea urchins and ammonites.

Glaciation following the Namurian phase facilitated greater denudation. The result is that Inisheer is one of the finest examples of a Glacio-Karst landscape in the world. The effects of the last glacial period (the Midlandian) are most in evidence, with the island overrun by ice during this glaciation. The impact of earlier Karstification (solutional erosion) has been eliminated by the last glacial period, so any Karstification now seen dates from approximately 10,000 years ago and the island Karst is thus recent.

Solutional processes have widened and deepened the grykes of the limestone pavement. Pre-existing lines of weakness in the rock (vertical joints) contribute to the formation of extensive fissures separated by clints (flat pavement-like slabs). The rock karstification facilitates the formation of subterranean drainage.

Climate and agriculture

The island has a temperate climate. Average air temperatures range from 15 °C (59 °F) in July to 6 °C (43 °F) in January. The soil temperature does not usually drop below 6 °C (43 °F). Since grass will grow once the temperature rises above 6 °C (43 °F), this means that the island (like the neighbouring Burren) has one of the longest growing seasons in Ireland, and supports diverse and rich plant growth.

Late May is the sunniest time, and also likely the best time to view flowers, with the gentians and avens peaking (but orchid species blooming later).

Flora and fauna
The island supports arctic, Mediterranean and alpine plants side-by-side, due to the unusual environment. Like the Burren, the Aran islands are known for their remarkable assemblage of plants and animals. 
The grikes (crevices) provide moist shelter, thus supporting a wide range of plants including dwarf shrubs. Where the surface of the pavement is shattered into gravel, many of the hardier Arctic or alpine plants can be found. But when the limestone pavement is covered by a thin layer of soil, patches of grass are seen, interspersed with plants like the gentian and orchids.

Notable insects present include the butterfly the pearl-bordered fritillary (Boloria euphrosyne), brown hairstreak (Thecla betulae), marsh fritillary (Euphydryas aurinia) and wood white (Leptidea sinapis); the moths, the burren green (Calamia tridens), Irish annulet (Gnophos dumetata) and transparent burnet (Zygaena purpuralis); and the hoverfly Doros profuges.

History

In 1885 a burial site called Cnoc Raithní was discovered which dates back to 1500 BC. This is the earliest evidence of human settlement of the island.
 
Saint Caomhán, the patron saint of Inisheer, according to some traditions, was the elder brother of Kevin of Glendalough. The ruins of Teampall Chaomháin in Inisheer cemetery have to be uncovered annually as the floor of it is well below the level of the sand. In the Middle Ages, the island was ruled by the O'Brien dynasty who provided most of the Kings of Thomond. This rule was exercised before the Anglo-Irish settled in Connacht in the 1230s.
 	
The Tribes of Galway paid the O'Briens an annual tribute of twelve tuns of wine "in consideration of their protection and expenses in guarding the bay and harbour of Galway against pirates and coast plunderers." The remains of the 14th-century 'O'Brien's Castle' are sited near the island's highest point. In 1582 the O'Flahertys of Connemara captured it. Today O'Flahertys still live on the island. In 1652 it was given to the Cromwellian invasion force and the O'Flahertys were defeated. They saw no use for it and the castle was partially dismantled, it has been unoccupied since.

The cargo vessel MV Plassy, which was shipwrecked off Inis Oírr on 8 March 1960, has since been thrown above the high tide mark at Carraig na Finise on the island by strong Atlantic waves. The wreck features in the opening credits of the TV show Father Ted.

A group of local Islanders, the Inisheer Rocket Crew, rescued the entire crew from the stricken vessel using a breeches buoy; an event captured in a pictorial display at the National Maritime Museum in Dún Laoghaire.

Antiquities
The following sites on the island are designated as National Monuments:
Creggankeel Fort (NM 41.01)
Grave of the Seven Daughters (NM 41.02)
St. Gobnet's Church (NM 41.05)
Cnoc Raithní (NM 41.06)
O'Brien's Castle (NM 41.07)
St. Cavan's Church (NM 41.08)

Demographics 
The table below reports data on Inis Oírr's population taken from Discover the Islands of Ireland (Alex Ritsema, Collins Press, 1999) and the Census of Ireland. Census data in Ireland before 1841 are not considered complete and/or reliable.

Transport
The island is reached by ferry from Rossaveal in Connemara and Doolin in County Clare as well as from the other Aran Islands. There is also a regional airport on each island which is served from Connemara Regional Airport by AerArann. A pier was opened in Doolin in June 2015 for commercial ferries serving the island. Islanders travel by foot or car around the island. Tourists can avail of tours/taxi trips by horse and trap.

Language
Irish is still today the daily language of the approximately 260 permanent residents. In addition, many school pupils from the mainland come to the island to learn Irish in an environment where it is a living language in the local college, Coláiste Laichtín during the months of June, July and August.

Sport
Some of the limestone sea cliffs have attracted interest from rock-climbers, though the bigger islands of Inis Mór and Inis Meáin are more popular. 
Diving is possible.

In the media
The island, including shots of the wrecked MV Plassy, is used to represent the fictional Craggy Island in the opening credits of the 1990s sitcom Father Ted.

Inisheer is also the name of a well-known slow air written by Thomas Walsh from Dublin, after a visit to the island in the 1970s.

Inis Oírr was discussed at length in the work of cultural anthropologist John Cowan Messenger under the name Inis Beag.

Gallery

References

External links

 
 Official tourism website for Inis Oírr and the Aran Islands

Gaeltacht places in County Galway
Aran Islands
Gaeltacht towns and villages